Chris Vanocur is an American television journalist for WSYX/WTTE in Columbus, Ohio.   He is a former reporter for KTVX.

Chris was honored with both a duPont-Columbia University Silver Baton and a George Foster Peabody Award for his role 
in uncovering Salt Lake City's Olympic bid scandal.

Chris was fired from KTVX in December 2012 when new owners let go several on-air reporters and most of the office staff. In 2013, Chris was hired by the ABC/FOX duopoly WSYX/WTTE in Columbus, Ohio as a senior reporter. 
He was named to the 2015 list of best state political reporters by the "Fix" section of the Washington Post.

He graduated from Northwestern University with a Bachelor of Science degree in Speech in 1982. He studied abroad at University of Edinburgh. 
He was a Western Knight Fellow at University of Southern California.
His father is Sander Vanocur.

Awards
 1998 George Foster Peabody Award
 Columbia University Dupont Silver Baton
 RTNDA Edward R. Murrow Award for Excellence in Reporting
 1998 Investigative Reporters and Editors award

References

External links 
"An Olympian Scandal", American Journalism Review, Alicia C. Shepard, April 1999
Journalist's Twitter

American television journalists
Living people
Year of birth missing (living people)
Northwestern University alumni
Alumni of the University of Edinburgh
American male journalists